Levala is a village in Mustvee Parish, Jõgeva County in eastern Estonia. , the population of the village was 40.

The Vooremaa Forest Ecology Station is located in Vooremaa.

References 

Villages in Jõgeva County